The 1984 Richmond Spiders football team was an American football team that represented the University of Richmond as an independent during the 1984 NCAA Division I-AA football season. In their fifth season under head coach Dal Shealy, Richmond compiled an 8–4 record. In the I-AA playoffs, the Spiders defeated Boston University in the first round but lost to Rhode Island in the quarterfinals.

Schedule

References

Richmond
Richmond Spiders football seasons
Richmond Spiders